Ugochukwu Henrietta Oha (born July 18, 1982, in Houston, Texas) is a Nigerian-American women's basketball player. She competed at the 2004 Summer Olympics with the Nigeria women's national basketball team and attended George Washington University. Oha attended Alief Hastings High School in Houston.

George Washington statistics
Source

References

1982 births
Living people
African Games bronze medalists for Nigeria
African Games medalists in basketball
African Games silver medalists for Nigeria
Basketball players at the 2004 Summer Olympics
Centers (basketball)
Competitors at the 2007 All-Africa Games
Connecticut Sun draft picks
George Washington Colonials women's basketball players
Nigerian expatriate basketball people in the United States
Nigerian women's basketball players
Olympic basketball players of Nigeria
Shanghai Swordfish players